Humphrey III de Bohun (before 1144 – ? December 1181) of Trowbridge Castle in Wiltshire and of Caldicot Castle in south-east Wales, 5th feudal baron of Trowbridge, was an Anglo-Norman nobleman and general who served King Henry II as Lord High Constable of England.

Origins
He was the son and heir of Humphrey II de Bohun (died 1164/1165) of Trowbridge Castle and of Caldicot Castle, 4th feudal baron of Trowbridge, by his wife Margaret of Hereford, a daughter of Miles FitzWalter of Gloucester, 1st Earl of Hereford, Lord of Brecknock (died 1143), Sheriff of Gloucester and Constable of England, by his wife Sibyl de Neufmarché.

Career
By 29 September 1165 he had succeeded to his father's estates, when he owed three hundred marks as feudal relief for the barony. From 1166 onwards he held his mother's inheritance, both her Bohun lands in Wiltshire and her inheritance from her father and brothers.

As Constable, Humphrey sided with King Henry II during the Revolt of 1173–1174. In August 1173 he was with the king and the royal army at Breteuil in France. Later that same year he and Richard de Lucy led the sack of Berwick-upon-Tweed and invaded Lothian to attack William the Lion, King of Scotland, who had sided with the rebels. He returned to England and played a major role in the defeat and capture of Robert Blanchemains, Earl of Leicester, at Fornham. By the end of 1174 he was in Normandy, where he witnessed the Treaty of Falaise between Henry and William of Scotland.

Marriage and children
At sometime between February 1171 and Easter 1175 he married Margaret of Huntingdon, widow  of Conan IV, Duke of Brittany (d.1171) and a daughter of Henry of Scotland, 3rd Earl of Northumberland, 3rd Earl of Huntingdon, son of King David I of Scotland and Queen Maud, 2nd Countess of Huntingdon. It has been suggested that Humphrey's wife was the Margaret who married Pedro Manrique de Lara, a Spanish nobleman, but there are discrepancies in the theory.
Through his marriage he became a brother-in-law of his enemy, William of Scotland. By  Margaret he had issue including:
Henry de Bohun, 1st Earl of Hereford, who was created Earl of Hereford by King John in April 1199.
Matilda de Bohun.

Death and burial
According to Robert of Torigni, in late 1181 Humphrey joined Henry the Young King in leading an army against Philip of Alsace, Count of Flanders, in support of King Philip II of France, during which campaign he died. He was buried at Llanthony Secunda Priory in Gloucestershire, founded in 1136 by his maternal grandfather Miles de Gloucester, 1st Earl of Hereford as a secondary house for the monks of Llanthony Priory in the Vale of Ewyas, in what is now Monmouthshire, Wales.

References
Graeme White, "Bohun, Humphrey (III) de (b. before 1144, d. 1181)," Oxford Dictionary of National Biography, Oxford University Press, 2004, accessed 20 December 2009.

Notes

1181 deaths
Year of birth uncertain
Anglo-Normans
Norman warriors
Lord High Constables of England
Bohun family